An International Driving Permit (IDP), often referred to as an international driving license, is a translation of a domestic driving licence that allows the holder to drive a private motor vehicle in any country or jurisdiction that recognises the document. The term International Driving Permit was first mentioned in the document prescribed in the International Convention relative to Motor Traffic that was signed at Paris in 1926, and is a translation of the French 'permis de conduire international', or 'international driving licence'. The Paris treaty, and all subsequent, use the word 'permit' exclusively in relation to all kinds of driving licence.

International Driving Permits are governed by three international conventions: the 1926 Paris International Convention relative to Motor Traffic, the 1949 Geneva Convention on Road Traffic, and the 1968 Vienna Convention on Road Traffic. When a state is contracted to more than one convention, the newest one terminates and replaces previous ones.

The IDP, whose A6 size (148 × 105 mm) is slightly larger than a passport, has a grey cover and white inside pages. The outside and inside of the front cover shall be printed in (at least one of) the national language(s) of the issuing State. The last two inside pages shall be printed in French, and pages preceding those two pages shall repeat the first of them in several languages, which must include English, Russian and Spanish.

IDPs are issued by a national government directly, or through a network of AIT/FIA organizations, authorized by their governments to issue them. For the latter case those issuing organizations are mostly automobile associations, such as American Automobile Association in the United States, Norwegian Automobile Federation in Norway and Riksförbundet M Sverige in Sweden. As there are many unofficial sellers on the internet, the AIT/FIA has created an approved directory to all IDP issuing organizations in the world.

To be valid, the IDP must be accompanied by a valid driving licence issued in the applicant's country of residence. An IDP is not required if the driver's domestic licence meets the requirements of the 1949 or 1968 convention; the domestic licence can be used directly in a foreign jurisdiction that is a party to that convention. In addition, other arrangements eliminates the need of an IDP in some countries, such as the European driving licence valid within the European Economic Area.

Driver information

1968 convention (as amended in 2011) 

The convention has been ratified by 83 countries/jurisdictions. Examples of countries/jurisdictions that have not ratified the Convention include Ireland, Canada, the United States, Cyprus, Iceland, Malta, China and Malaysia.

The main regulations about driving licences are in Annex 6 (domestic driving permit) and Annex 7 (International Driving Permit). The currently active version of those is in force in each contracting party since no later than 29 March 2011 (Article 43). According to the 1968 Vienna Convention, an IDP must have an expiration date of no more than three years from its issue date or until the expiration date of national driving permit, whichever is earlier, and it is valid for a period of one year upon the arrival in the foreign country.

Article 41 of the convention describes requirements for driving licences. Key of those are:
 every driver of a motor vehicle must hold a driving licence;
 driving licences can be issued only after passing theoretical and practical exams, which are regulated by each country or jurisdiction;
 Contracting parties shall recognize as valid for driving in their territories:
 domestic driving licence conforms to the provisions of annex 6 to the convention;
 International Driving Permit conforms to the provisions of annex 7 to the convention, on condition that it is presented with the corresponding domestic driving licence;
 driving licences issued by a contracting party shall be recognised in the territory of another contracting party until this territory becomes the place of normal residence of their holder;
 all of the above does not apply to learner-driver licences;
 the period of validity of an international driving permit shall be either no more than three years after the date of issue or until the date of expiry of the domestic driving licence, whichever is earlier;
 Contracting parties may refuse to recognise the validity of driving licences for persons under eighteen or, for categories C, D, CE and DE, under twenty-one;
 an international driving permit shall only be issued by the contracting party in whose territory the holder has their normal residence and that issued the domestic driving licence or that recognised the driving licence issued by another contracting party; it shall not be valid for use in that territory.

1968 convention (original) 
The convention had amendments on 3 September 1993 and 28 March 2006. There is a European Agreement supplementing the Convention on Road Traffic (1968), which was concluded in Geneva, on 1 May 1971.

Note that before 29 March 2011 the convention demanded contracting parties to recognise as valid for driving in their territories:
 any domestic driver's licence drawn up in their national language or in one of their national languages, or, if not drawn up in such a language, accompanied by a certified translation;
 any domestic driver's licence conforming to the provisions of annex 6 to the convention; and
 any international driver permit conforming to the provisions of annex 7 to the convention.

Prior to 29 March 2011, annex 6 and annex 7 defined forms of driver's licences that are different from those defined after that date. Driving licences issued before 29 March 2011 that match older edition of the annexes are valid until their expiration dates (article 43).

1949 convention 
The 1949 Geneva Convention on Road Traffic has been ratified by 101 states. The 1949 Convention's description of a driving permit and international driving permit are located in Annexes 9 and 10. Switzerland signed but did not ratify the convention. The 1949 Geneva Convention states that an IDP remains valid for one year from the date of issue, with a grace period of six months.

There is a European Agreement supplementing the 1949 Convention on Road Traffic, in addition to the 1949 Protocol on Road Signs and Signals, concluded in Geneva on 16 September 1950.

 "Permissible maximum weight" of a vehicle means the weight of the vehicle and its maximum load when the vehicle is ready for road.
 "Maximum load" means the weight of the load declared permissible by the competent authority of the country(or jurisdiction) of registration of the vehicle.
 "Light trailers" shall be those of permissible maximum weight not exceeding 750 kg (1,650 lbs).

1926 convention 
The 1926 International Convention relative to Motor Traffic is the older IDP Convention. It is only required in Somalia. International Driving Permits according to the 1926 Convention on Motor Traffic might also still be valid in Liechtenstein and Mexico. However, both are parties of the above-mentioned later conventions, thus the most recent signed convention is the valid one. Mexico also recognizes the Inter-American Driving Permit according to the convention on the Regulation of Inter-American Automotive Traffic 1943.

Validity 
According to the 1968 Vienna Convention, an IDP must have an expiration date of no more than three years from its issue date or until the expiration date of national driving permit, whichever is earlier, and it is valid for a period of one year upon the arrival in the foreign country. The previous convention (1949 Geneva Convention) stated that an IDP remains valid for one year from the date of issue.

The IDP is not valid for driving in the country or jurisdiction where it was issued, it can only be used in foreign countries, and it must be shown with the carrier's original driver's license.

Countries and jurisdictions that recognize IDP 

** IDP must be exchanged for a local driving licence.

 In relations between the Contracting States, the 1949 Geneva Convention terminated and replaced the International Convention relative to Motor Traffic and the International Convention relative to Road Traffic signed at Paris on 24 April 1926, and the convention on the Regulation of Inter- American Automotive Traffic opened for signature at Washington on 15 December 1943.
 In relations between the Contracting States, the 1968 Vienna Convention terminated and replaced the International Convention relative to Motor Traffic and the International Convention relative to Road Traffic, signed at Paris on 24 April 1926, the convention on the Regulation of Inter-American Automotive Traffic, opened for signature at Washington on 15 December 1943, and the Convention on Road Traffic, opened for signature at Geneva on 19 September 1949.

ISO compliant driving licence  
ISO/IEC 18013 establishes guidelines for the design format and data content of an ISO-compliant driving licence (IDL). The design approach is to establish a secure domestic driving permit (DDP) and accompanying booklet for international use, instead of the international driving permit (IDP) paper document.

This standard however, it should be noted, has no official mandate or recognition from the WP.1 of UNECE as a replacement for the current IDP standards as described in the 1949 and 1968 Conventions.

Card design 
The requirements with regards to content and layout of the data elements is contained in Annex A of ISO/IEC 18013-1:2018. While the main ideology is a minimum acceptable set of requirements, sufficient freedom is afforded to the issuing authorities of driving licences to meet domestic needs such as existing standards, data contents and security elements.

Booklet layout 
The specifications of the layout of the booklet is defined in Annex G of ISO/IEC 18013-1:2018. There are two options; a booklet with some personalisation or a booklet with no personalisation.

The booklet shall be marginally larger than a ID-1 size driving license card, with an insert pocket for storage of the card, and for convenient carrying of the booklet. The front cover should include the logo of the UN or the issuing country and the words “Translation of Driving Licence” and "Traduction du Permis de Conduire ".

References

External links 

 Information about scams
International Driver's License  at Snopes — more information about IDP scams or so-called "International Driver's License" scams
William Scott Dion, et al. — U.S. Federal Trade Commission press release about legal action against PT Resource Center for selling bogus IDP's and related identification documents
 Copies of treaties

1926 Paris International Convention relative to Motor Traffic on the United Kingdom's Foreign & Commonwealth Office website
1949 Geneva Convention on Road Traffic on the United Nations Economic Commission for Europe (UNECE) website
1968 Vienna Convention on Road Traffic (Consolidated version) on the UNECE website
Contracting Parties to the Convention on Road Traffic – Vienna, 8 November 1968 — list of countries, on the United Nations Treaty Collection website

Driving licences
Identity documents
Traffic law
Road traffic management
International travel documents